Ethel Airport  is located  northwest of Ethel, Ontario, Canada.

References

Registered aerodromes in Ontario